, or simply known as Gag Manga Biyori, is a Japanese manga series written and illustrated by Kosuke Masuda. It started in Shueisha's shōnen manga magazine Monthly Shōnen Jump in the January 2000 issue. The magazine ceased publication in June 2007, and the series was transferred to the then-brand new magazine Jump Square in November of the same year, where it was published until November 2014. Shueisha collected its chapters in fifteen tankōbon volumes. The manga continued in Jump Square, under the title Gag Manga Biyori GB, in December 2014. Gag Manga Biyori features a hyperactive, random, and nonsensical style that revolves around various plots and characters throughout. Its first anime adaptation was a short film animated by Toei as part of Jump Festa in 2002. The first anime series and the sequel were produced by Artland, while the third and fourth sequel were produced by Studio Deen, selecting stories from the manga. Most episodes are five minutes long.

Overview
Gag Manga Biyori is a nonsensical comedy series known for its bizarre plot setups and non-sequitur humor. It has also been described as a "Monty Python-esque weirdness." In the anime adaptation, its various characters are mostly voiced by Yūji Ueda, Kaori Nazuka and Takeshi Maeda.

Media

Manga
The magazine ceased its publication on June 6, 2007. Following a brief run in Weekly Shōnen Jump from August 27 to October 29, 2007, the series was transferred to the then brand new magazine Jump Square on November 2 of the same year. In October 2014, it was announced that the series would change its title to coincide with its 15th anniversary, being serialized under the title Gag Manga Biyori until November 4 of the same year. Shueisha collected its chapters in fifteen tankōbon volumes, released from September 4, 2000, to October 3, 2014.

The series continued in Jump Square, under the title , starting on December 4, 2014. Shueisha released its first tankōbon volume on December 4, 2015. As of November 4, 2020, five volumes have been released.

Anime

Episode list

Season one

Season two

Season three

Gag Manga Biyori +

Theme songs
 Opening
  by Yuji Ueda (Season one)
  by Yuji Ueda and Kaori Nazuka (Season two)
  by Yuji Ueda (Season three)
  by Yuji Ueda (Season four)

 Ending
  by Tetsuya Kanmuri

References

External links
 Official site at Kids Station
 

2014 comics endings
Anime series based on manga
Artland (company)
Comedy anime and manga
Shōnen manga
Shueisha franchises
Shueisha manga
Studio Deen